SM UB-47 was a Type UB II submarine or U-boat for the German Imperial Navy during World War I. UB-47 was sold to the Austro-Hungarian Navy ( or ) during the war. In Austro-Hungarian service the B was dropped from her name and she was known as SM U-47 or U-XLVII as a member of the Austro-Hungarian U-43 class.

UB-47 was ordered in July 1915 and was laid down at the AG Weser shipyard in Bremen in September. She was equipped to carry a complement of four torpedoes for her two bow torpedo tubes and had an  deck gun. As part of a group of six submarines selected for Mediterranean service, UB-47 was broken into railcar sized components and shipped to Pola where she was assembled and launched in June 1916, and commissioned in July.

The German Imperial Navy was having difficulties in finding trained submarine crews and offered to sell UB-47 and a sister boat  to the Austro-Hungarian Navy. After the terms were agreed to in June 1917, both boats were handed over at Pola. When commissioned into the Austro-Hungarian Navy, the B in her designation was dropped so that she became U-47 or U-XLVII. She sank an additional three ships in Austro-Hungarian service through the end of the war. U-47 was ceded to France as a war reparation in 1920 and broken at Bizerta that same year.

Design and construction 
The German UB II design improved upon the design of the UB I boats, which had been ordered in September 1914. In service, the UB I boats were found to be too small and too slow. A major problem was that, because they had a single propeller shaft/engine combo, if either component failed, the U-boat became almost totally disabled. To rectify this flaw, the UB II boats featured twin propeller shafts and twin engines (one shaft for each engine), which also increased the U-boat's top speed. The new design also included more powerful batteries, larger torpedo tubes, and a deck gun. As a UB II boat, U-47 could also carry twice the torpedo load of her UB I counterparts, and nearly ten times as much fuel. To contain all of these changes the hull was larger, and the surface and submerged displacement was more than double that of the UB I boats.

She had a single hull with saddle tanks and had a draught of  when surfaced. She displaced  while submerged but only  on the surface.

The submarine was equipped with twin Daimler diesel engines and twin Siemens-Schuckart electric motors—for surfaced and submerged running, respectively. Her electric motors and batteries provided a range of at  while submerged. UB-47 was equipped with two  bow torpedo tubes and could carry four torpedoes. The U-boat was also armed with one  Uk L/30 deck gun.

UB-47 was laid down by AG Weser at its Bremen shipyard on 4 September 1915. As one of six U-boats selected for service in the Mediterranean while under construction, UB-47 was broken into railcar-sized components and shipped overland to the Austro-Hungarian port of Pola. Shipyard workers from Weser assembled the boat and her five sisters at Pola, where she was launched on 17 June.

German Imperial Navy career 

SM UB-47 was commissioned into the German Imperial Navy on 4 July 1916 under the command of Oberleutnant zur See Wolfgang Steinbauer. UB-47, Steinbauer's first U-boat command, was assigned to the Navy's Pola Flotilla in which she remained throughout her German career. Although the flotilla was based in Pola, the site of the main Austro-Hungarian Navy base, boats of the flotilla operated out of the Austro-Hungarian base at Cattaro which was located farther south and closer to the Mediterranean. German U-boats typically returned to Pola only for repairs.

Although Italy and Germany would not formally be at war for another ten days, German U-boats in the Mediterranean routinely attacked Italian vessels by posing as Austro-Hungarian submarines and flying the ensign of that country's navy. Stampalia was an ocean liner of  that had formerly been in passenger service between New York and Genoa, and had been one of the first Italian merchant vessels to be armed against submarine attacks. At the time of her sinking, she was in the service of the Italian government but was not carrying any passengers; no casualties from Stampalia were reported in the attack.

Three weeks later, Steinbauer and UB-47 scored a triple kill, sinking three ships on the same day. The third ship was the Greek ship Spetzai, headed from Cyprus to Liverpool when sunk in the same vicinity. There were no casualties from any of the three ships; the crews of Butetown and Llangorse were rescued and landed at Marseilles on 16 September.

The hospital ship  picked up 302 survivors from Franconia; 12 men were killed in the attack.

UB-47s next success came a week later, on 11 October, when the 5,002 GRT British steamer Crosshill was sunk west of Malta with the loss of four men. A German military announcement of 20 October proclaiming Steinbauer's sinking of the ship reported that Crosshills cargo included horses and Serbian grooms. The following day, Sebek, a British ship headed to Alexandria, was torpedoed southeast of Gozo. Although the German Admiralty reported her sunk, Sebeks captain was able to ground his ship and prevent it from sinking. On 14 October, UB-47 sank five small Italian sailing vessels—ranging in size from 32 to 80 GRT—near Syracuse, Sicily. The next day, UB-47 closed out the month of October with the sinking of the Greek steamer Avis. UB-47s tally of sunken ships for the month of October came to 24,776 gross register tons, which accounted for nearly 20% of the total sunk by all German U-boats in the Mediterranean.

On patrol in the Aegean Sea on 27 December, Steinbauer came across the French pre-dreadnought battleship . Although it was screened by light cruisers and naval trawlers, Steinbauer was, nonetheless, able to sink the 11,100-ton displacement ship east of Cerigo. Two men were killed in the initial explosion and another two men died in the aftermath; Gauloiss normal complement was 631 men. Five days later, New Year's Day 1917, UB-47 torpedoed and sank the Cunard Line ship —in service as a British troopship—at position ,  from Cape Matapan. Under the command of Captain William T. Turner, who had been in command of  when that liner was sunk in May 1915, the 14,278 GRT Ivernia was ferrying troops to Salonica when sunk by UB-47. Because of the heavy weather at the time of Ivernias sinking, 120 officers and men and 33 crewmen were killed in the attack. Like Franconia, both Gaulois and Ivernia were among the largest ships sunk by U-boats; Ivernia was the 20th largest sunk. Two days after the attack on Ivernia, UB-47 torpedoed and damaged the British steamer , killing one person in the process. The  Huntsend was the former North German Lloyd liner Lützow, which had been captured by British naval forces in the Mediterranean in August 1914, and, like UB-47, had been built by AG Weser in Bremen.

On 1 March 1917, UB-47 torpedoed and damaged the British steamer Euterpe near Suda Bay, killing two men in the process. A week later, on 8 March, Steinbauer sank his last ship at the helm of UB-47, when Georgian was sent to the bottom  from Cape Sidero. The 1890 British ship, rated at 5,088 gross register tons, was carrying government stores; five of her crew perished in the attack.

On 1 April, Oberleutnant zur See Hans Hermann Wendlandt replaced Steinbauer as commanding officer of UB-47. A week after assuming his first U-boat command, the 30-year-old Wendlandt scored his first success by sinking two Greek steamers on the same day. Livatho was sailing in ballast from Salonica for New York when she was sunk northwest of Crete by an explosive charge placed by UB-47s crew. Nestos was carrying a load of wheat from New York for Piraeus when shelled and sunk  from Sapientza. Three days later, the British ship Cyfarthfa was torpedoed  from Cerigotto. The master of Cyfarthfa, which had been headed from Oran to Salonica, was taken prisoner by Wendlandt.

Although a part of the Royal Hellenic Navy, Doxa had been seized by the French in October 1916 and was operating as a French ship with an all-French crew when torpedoed and sunk by UB-47 in the Straits of Messina; 29 sailors died in the attack. Three days later, Wendlandt sank two Italian sailing ships of about  each while east of Sicily. Five days later, UB-47 attacked the Japanese steamer Shinsan Maru, from Karachi with a cargo of wheat for delivery to Italy. Wendlandt torpedoed the 1898 ship between Crete and Sicily. Shinsan Maru was the last ship sunk by UB-47 in her German service.

On 21 July, UB-47 was decommissioned at Pola and handed over to the Austro-Hungarian Navy.

Austro-Hungarian Navy service 
In November 1916, the German Imperial Navy, having a hard time finding trained submarine crews, inquired to find out if its ally Austria-Hungary was interested in purchasing some of its Mediterranean submarines. A general agreement led to protracted negotiations, which stalled over the outflow of Austro-Hungarian gold reserves to Germany. But, with all of the details worked out, the two parties agreed on the sale of UB-47 and sister ship  to Austria-Hungary in June 1917.

When handed over by the Germans on 21 July, UB-47 was in a "worn out condition". Despite the rough condition of the boat, the U-boat was commissioned into the Austro-Hungarian Navy on 30 July 1917 as SM U-47, dropping the B from the U-boat's former designation. Linienschiffsleutnant Otto Molitor was installed as the U-boat's new commander.
U-47s first success in Austro-Hungarian service came nearly six months later when, on 12 January 1918, Molitor torpedoed the French steamer Mica from Saigon just short of her destination of Milos.

In early April, Linienschiffsleutnant Reichsfreiherr Hugo von Seyffertitz replaced Molitor as commander of U-47, and a month later, von Seyffertitz achieved his first success as U-47s commander. The British steamer Itinda, a  ship built in 1900, was sunk north of Susa, Libya, with one man killed. The next victory for von Seyffertitz and U-47 came in September.

At the end of the war, U-47 was at Cattaro. In her Austro-Hungarian Navy career, U-47 sank two merchant ships of 6,201 gross register tons, and sank a single warship of  displacement. U-47 was ceded to France as a war reparation in 1920, towed to Bizerta, and broken up there within a year.

Summary of raiding history

As the German UB-47

As the Austro-Hungarian U-47

Notes

References

Bibliography 

 
 

 
 
 
 
 
 
 
 
 

German Type UB II submarines
U-boats commissioned in 1916
U-43-class submarines (Austria-Hungary)
U-boats commissioned in 1917
World War I submarines of Germany
1916 ships